Aegilops biuncialis is a species of plant in the family Poaceae native to the Mediterranean, Black Sea, and Middle East.

References

biuncialis
Flora of Europe
Flora of Western Asia